Spriggite is an uranyl hydroxide mineral with chemical formula Pb3(UO2)6O8(OH)2·3H2O. Its type locality is Mt Painter region, Arkaroola region, Flinders Ranges, South Australia. It was named after Reginald C. Sprigg (1919–1994).

References 

Oxide minerals
Monoclinic minerals
Minerals in space group 15